Andhra Pradesh is well connected with various destinations in India, as well as other countries. It has road, rail, airways. With a long coast of Bay of Bengal and many sea ports, it flourishes in sea trade as well. The state has one of the largest railway junctions at Vijayawada and Visakhapatnam Port being one of the largest cargo handling seaport.

Road 

The road network of the state is maintained by Andhra Pradesh Road Development Corporation, under the Roads and Buildings Department of the state.

National and state highways 

The highway forms a part of Golden Quadrilateral Project undertaken by National Highways Development Project and a part of AH 45 of Asian Highway Network.

Expressways
Some of the  highways are developed as Expressways in PPP model. Notable among these are:
 Vijayawada–Hyderabad Expressway
 NAM Expressway

Bus 

The Andhra Pradesh State Road Transport Corporation (APSRTC) operates bus services and is the primary mode of public transport in the state, which is owned by the state government. , it had a total of 11,918 buses with 970 bus shelters and connecting over 14,000 villages in over 3,000 routes. The headquarters of APSRTC is located at NTR Administrative Block of RTC House in Pandit Nehru bus station of Vijayawada.

Apart from government run APSRTC, there are also many private buses operating in the state. Auto rickshaws and cabs are also a common mode of transport, with the recent introduction of She Autos, driven by women.

Freight 

The transport of goods in the state depends mainly on lorrys, mini trucks and auto rickshaws. APSRTC, as a joint venture with Alloy Nitrides Ltd. was established in the year 1976, used for transportation of unaccompanied luggage, parcel/packets by their buses.

Railways 

Andhra Pradesh has a total railway route of 3703.25 km. The rail density of the state is 16.59 per , compared to an all India average of 20. The Howrah–Chennai main line which runs through the state is proposed to be upgraded into a high-speed rail corridor through the Diamond Quadrilateral project of the Indian Railways.

The railway network spans two zones, further subdivided into divisions - Vijayawada, Guntur and Guntakal railway divisions of South Central Railway zone., and Waltair railway division of East Coast Railway zone.

There are three A1 and twenty three A-category railway stations in the state. Visakhapatnam railway station has been declared the cleanest railway station in the country. The railway station of Shimiliguda was the first highest broad gauge railway station in the country.

Airports 

Andhra Pradesh has three functional domestic airports and three international airports. The state has a customs airport at Visakhapatnam. It serves more than  passengers annually. It operates flights to Singapore, Dubai, United Arab Emirates, Malaysia, Thailand and domestic Services as Well. There are three domestic airports at Kadapa, Rajahmundry and Kurnool.

Vijayawada Airport, Visakhapatnam Airport and Tirupati Airport serve as international airports. There are plans to setup an airport in every district of Andhra Pradesh.

Visakhapatnam airport is the largest airport in the state and handles over 60% of the domestic traffic of the state. The total passenger traffic in the state stood at 1.48 million as of 2013.

Seaports 

The state has 14 Ports with a sum of  capacity. Visakhapatnam, Gangavaram and Krishnapatnam Ports are the three deep water ports. Government planned to develop new ports at Bhavanapadu, Narsapur, Ramayapatnam and Duggirajapatnam.

Inland waterways 

Inland waterways are the most economical way of transporting goods in Andhra Pradesh. National Waterway 4 starts at Kakinada and travels through Eluru, Vijayawada cities in the state and ends at Puducherry near Chennai. As of 2014 a network of 888 km of National Waterway is available in the state. This waterway is scheduled to begin transport in December 2017.

References